František Zeman (born 10 October 1950) is a Czech former skier. He competed in the Nordic combined event at the 1976 Winter Olympics.

References

External links
 

1950 births
Living people
Czech male Nordic combined skiers
Olympic Nordic combined skiers of Czechoslovakia
Nordic combined skiers at the 1976 Winter Olympics
People from Vysoké nad Jizerou
Sportspeople from the Liberec Region